Nabeel Qureshi (born 1985) is a Pakistani film director, screenwriter, and occasional singer best known for making films that tackle socio-economic issues. His debut directed film is Na Maloom Afraad in (2014), where he won an award for a best film director. was followed by Actor in Law (2016) for which he again won an award for best director.

Early life 
Qureshi was born in 1985 in Sukkur, Sindh and moved to Karachi in 2004. He started his career at AAJ TV, where directed promos, after one year he left the job and started studying theatre at National Academy of Performing Arts (NAPA). He dropped out of the theatre because of some issues with the faculty in 2006.

Career 
Qureshi started his career in the mid-2000s by directing ads, cooking shows, television shows, and television films.

Qureshi is also the director of the comedy news show Banana News Network, which has been aired on Geo TV since 2011, it broadcasts every Wednesday at 11:05 PM (PST).

In 2012, Qureshi directed the music video of Mohsin Abbas Haider's debut song Beparwah Dhola.

In 2014, Qureshi made his directorial debut with Na Maloom Afraad, which he co-wrote with his college friend Fizza Ali Meerza, who produced the film along with Mehdi Ali through her Filmwala Pictures. The comedy thriller stars Fahad Mustafa, Mohsin Abbas Haider, and Urwa Hocane, released domestically on October 6, 2014, by Hum Films. The film became a box office shot in Pakistan and grossed ₨12.2 crore until March 2015, with a budget of ₨9 crore. At the 14th Lux Style Awards, Na Maloom Afraad won the Best Film award, Nabeel went on to win the Lux Style Award for Best Director and  Best Original Soundtrack for the lyrics of "Billi" for his film Na Maloom Afraad, which he shared with Meerza. 

In January 2015, Qureshi revealed that he and his writing partner Meerza were working on another project, later named Actor in Law which would be a social satire.  The first spell of the film was shot in Karachi in January 2016.  The film was released on the occasion of Eid al-Adha on September 9, 2016, to good response from the audience and went on to collect  at the box office.  

After the success of Na Maloom Afraad, the director-producer duo started thinking about a possible sequel of the film. Producer Fizza Ali Meerza said after nine months of the success of NMA, in an interview with The Express Tribune that, "We'd hopefully like to start working on a NMA sequel, but don't have a timeline in mind at present,". "We don't know if it's going to be a proper sequel or a spiritual successor through which we'll tell a different story this time". Filming began in March 2017 in Karachi, where few scenes were shot.  while nearly the whole film was shot in Cape Town, South Africa.  The film released on the festival of Eid al-Adha, 2 September 2017 in Pakistan and worldwide. The film collected  at the box office. 

Later on he directed and co-wrote the social-comedy drama film Load Wedding, starring Fahad Mustafa and Mehwish Hayat: which had released on 2018 Eid al-Adha, and which earned critical acclaim as well worked in the box-office.

Filmography

Films

Frequent actor collaborations

Television

TV 
 Banana News Network (Comedy TV show)

As ads/music video director 
 Beparwah Dhola (2012), song by Mohsin Abbas Haider

Discography

Singles
 Khamosh Dono (2011)

Awards and nominations

See also
List of film directors
List of Pakistani television directors

References

External links 
 

Living people
People from Sukkur District
Film directors from Karachi
Pakistani television directors
Pakistani music video directors
Pakistani screenwriters
Pakistani male singers
Sindhi people
Writers from Karachi
1985 births
National Academy of Performing Arts alumni